Brannagan is an Irish surname. Notable people with the surname include:

 Cameron Brannagan (born 1996), English professional footballer
 Danny Brannagan (born 1986),  Canadian football quarterback
 Mary Brannagan, Irish chess master

Surnames of Irish origin
Anglicised Irish-language surnames